Apni Apni Love Story is a 2019 Pakistani romantic comedy television film aired on ARY Digital on 13 August 2019. It is directed by Kashif Saleem and written by Faiza Iftikhar under the banner of Film Factory. It has Mahnoor Baloch, Aijaz Aslam, Azfar Rehman, Sadaf Kanwal and Shehnaz Pervaiz in pivot roles.

Plot
The story revolves around Shanzey and Umar, played by Sadaf Kanwal and Aijaz Aslam respectively. Shanzey is the niece of Umar, and she wants her uncle to get married. Umar loved Sidra, played by Mahnoor Baloch, in his youth but both couldn't got married at that time. Fate brings them together after a hiatus of many years and that's how an old love story began.

Cast
Mahnoor Baloch as Sidra
Aijaz Aslam as Umar
Azfar Rehman as Sameer
Sadaf Kanwal as Shanzey
Shehnaz Pervaiz as Sameer's aunt
Ayaz Samoo as Rehan

References

Pakistani television films
2019 films
2019 romantic comedy films